The XVI International Chopin Piano Competition was held in Warsaw, Poland from 3 to 20 October 2010, for the first time organized by the Fryderyk Chopin Institute. Prize winners' concerts were held October 21–23. The first prize was awarded to Yulianna Avdeeva.

Winners 

The competition consisted of three stages and a final.

The following prizes were awarded:

In addition, five special prizes were awarded independently:

Jurors 
The jury panel for the competition included:
  Martha Argerich ( VII)
  Bella Davidovich ( IV)
  Jan Ekier (honorary chairman)
  Philippe Entremont
  Nelson Freire
  Adam Harasiewicz ( V)
  Andrzej Jasiński (chairman)
  Kevin Kenner ( XII)
  
  Piotr Paleczny (vice-chairman)
  Katarzyna Popowa-Zydroń
   Đặng Thái Sơn ( X)
  Fou Ts'ong ( V)

Participants

Results

1 Withdrawal

References

Further reading

External links 
 The International Chopin Piano Competition

International Chopin Piano Competition
2010 in music
2010 in Poland
2010 in Polish music
2010s in Warsaw
October 2010 events in Europe